Casey Calvert is an American pornographic actress and film director. She has won several awards in the pornographic film industry,  and has written about it in mainstream media publications. Calvert entered the adult media industry with early work as an art model and fetish model at age 21. She chose her stage name after one of her college professors, Clay Calvert.

She began working in adult film in 2012. She received an XRCO Award for her film work in 2015. This was followed by an AVN Award in 2017, and another XRCO Award in 2018.  In 2015, Calvert began writing for publications including GameLink and The Huffington Post. She was a contributor to the 2015 book, Coming Out Like a Porn Star: Essays on Pornography, Protection, and Privacy.

Calvert expanded her film career, from acting to directing and producing.  She was an actor, writer, and casting director on the Pure Taboo production, The Starlet: A Casey Calvert Story. Erika Lust hired Calvert to direct a feature series Primary. By 2020, she devoted half her career to her work as a film director.

Early life and education
Calvert was raised Conservative Jewish and attended synagogue every Shabbat (Saturday) morning until her Bat Mitzvah. Her family switched to a Reform synagogue and began attending only on Jewish holidays. She spent her early life in Gainesville, Florida. Calvert attended the University of Florida where she studied filmmaking. She chose her stage name in honor of Professor Clay Calvert after taking his class on Mass Media Law as a sophomore. She said, "It felt right because really if I hadn't taken his class, I wouldn't be where I am right now," referring to learning during his class that pornography was not illegal as she had initially thought. Pornography and legal case law related to the film industry were a focus of the media class. She also studied the First Amendment to the United States Constitution and learned that pornography is a form of protected freedom of speech in the United States. Calvert said that her first name, "Casey", is derived from the initials of her celebrity crush's children—K. and C.—but has not specified who they are.

Career

Modeling and acting
Before appearing in adult films, Calvert worked as a nude model, doing fetish and art modelling in the spring of her junior year of college, at 21. She learned about the fetish scene from contacts in Orlando, Florida. Calvert features in The Mammoth Book of Erotic Photography. She modeled for Hustler's Taboo. She entered the adult film industry on November 5, 2012, with her first scene for SexArt studio.  Calvert has described her career as: "just like having any other job, except you're naked on the Internet". Calvert launched her website in January 2014. She received a nomination for an XRCO Award (X-Rated Critics Association) for Best New Starlet in 2014, the first year she was eligible.

The XRCO recognized Calvert with an Unsung Siren Award in 2015 recognizing her as, "the female star who consistently demonstrates excellence without due recognition from the media". Sociologist and XRCO member, Chauntelle Tibbals, commented on Calvert's selection praising her "performance work in a variety of genres" and "her considerable contributions to the adult industry". Calvert made fetish and BDSM part of her niche as an actress in adult films, appearing in a featured performance Jessica Drake's Guide to Wicked Sex: BDSM for Beginners directed by Jessica Drake in 2015. Writing for Bustle, Amanda Chatel observed, "Unlike adult performers of the past, Calvert is an educated woman who didn't stumble into porn, but headed there because that's what she wanted." Calvert worked with Bobbi Starr on BDSM film shoots and appreciated her respect for performers. Calvert contributed to virtual reality pornography, where her likeness was digitally scanned and uploaded to an avatar.

Calvert gained early experience directing by creating custom videos. She took requests from clients for selectively made films to make a profit in the face of online piracy. Priced at up to $10,000 per request, Calvert saw this as a way to interact directly with her fans and create her own content. She found billing them difficult because of restrictions by payment processors related to adult content. Calvert has tried to pursue a mainstream acting and modeling career, but potential employers have refused to hire her because of her work in porn. She says she has been recognized even while auditioning under her legal name.

Writing and directing
The USC School of Cinematic Arts at the University of Southern California featured Calvert in 2015 on a panel discussion, "50 Shades of Erotica: The Blurring of the Line Between Hollywood and Adult Entertainment". In September 2015, GameLink hired Calvert to write a BDSM and fetish-themed column for their The Naked Truth blog, and to answer readers' questions on their website. She contributed to GameLink in 2016 as an expert on topics related to fetish and BDSM, and won their 2016 Porn Star Madness Competition against 16 other adult stars. Calvert wrote for GameLink once a month sharing her knowledge of fetish and BDSM gained from her experiences with readers. The company's vice president Jeff Dillon called Calvert a "great advocate for the BDSM/fetish lifestyle". She has written about pornography for The Huffington Post, Cosmpolitan, UPROXX, Mandatory.com, Refinery 29, CraveOnline and The Daily Beast. She contributed an essay in Coming Out Like a Porn Star: Essays on Pornography, Protection, and Privacy, edited by Jiz Lee, about her early introduction to pornography and why she chose a career in the industry. The Economist included her essay in a 2015 discussion of Internet pornography, "Can porn be good for us?", featuring Calvert with advertising consultant Cindy Gallop and University of Texas at Austin journalism professor Robert Jensen. In January 2016, Calvert gave a sex education seminar, "BDSM: From Reel to Real",  as part of the XBIZ events series. She taught the seminar to educate attendees about how BDSM and fetish scenes are filmed, and the film editing process.

Calvert also diversified her career by directing. In 2019, Gamma Entertainment hired Calvert and her husband Eli Cross to direct films for the Adult Time platform. Her directorial debut with Adult Time was the series Maid for Each Other. Calvert worked with distributor Adult Time on a Pure Taboo production as actor, writer, and casting director, titled, The Starlet: A Casey Calvert Story. Calvert and Gamma Entertainment's head of production, Bree Mills, worked on the script. Calvert wrote her character as an antihero, exploring how fame and money have the potential to impact an individual's view of ethics. Mills described Calvert as "incredibly versatile, creative and intelligent as a writer and performer", who brought "a wealth of experience in writing, directing and producing from her own independent adult and mainstream projects" to the project. Calvert directed actresses Riley Reid and Aidra Fox, in the 2019 Girlsway series, Roleplay With Me, and actress Lauren Phillips in Schooled!.

Erika Lust hired Calvert to direct a feature series for LustCinema called Primary. Calvert also wrote the script. Inspired by the Netflix series, Easy, Calvert wrote a script of about 20–30 pages for each episode. The storyline is about four people living in Los Angeles and dealing with open relationships. Calvert shot Primary as a six-episode series. She was part of LustCinema's foray into production work in the United States. Calvert also led the casting process, taking her potential cast members through auditions. She directed actors including Penny Pax and Derrick Pierce. For this production, Calvert decided to include women filmmakers from mainstream cinema on her crew who had never worked on a pornographic film set. She filmed Primary over an 11-day production schedule. Calvert found the most difficult part of the production process was selecting sites for location shooting. She appreciated the increased freedom  she had transitioning from actress to director. Journalist Mackenzie Cummings-Grady wrote of her  directorial work, "The story is rich in details, and the cinematography, courtesy of breakout director Casey Calvert, is lush and captivating. It's some of the most opulent pornography ever created."

Calvert consulted with Jordyn Woods and advised her on how to support sex workers. She was featured at the 2020 AVN Adult Entertainment Expo on a panel, "Stepping Up to the Director's Seat", with women who had transitioned from actress to director including: Joanna Angel, Kayden Kross, Lena Paul and Aiden Starr. By 2020, half her time was spent as a film director.

Personal life
Calvert identifies as a feminist. i-D magazine called her a "committed feminist", and observed, "for Casey, porn isn't about objectifying women, [or] empowering the male gaze ... It's about exercising her right to choose what she does with her body." Calvert told Caitlin Stasey she wanted to debunk stereotypes about female sex workers, "What I can say is that not all sex workers are the stereotype people want to believe. Many of us are college educated, feminists, and absolutely love what we do." She explained her views on feminism to author Rich Moreland in the book, Pornography Feminism: As Powerful as She Wants to Be, saying, "Feminism is all about the right to choice."

She is married to industry director Eli Cross. They have been together since 2013; he also acts as her cinematographer. They got to know each other through film production work together. Her family is supportive of her career and Calvert maintains a good relationship with her mother and father. Before the start of her career in adult film, Calvert moved from Florida to Los Angeles, where she works and resides.

Filmmaker credits

Film
As director, writer, or producer

Television
As director, writer, or producer

Awards and nominations

See also
31st AVN Awards
32nd AVN Awards
34th AVN Awards
35th AVN Awards
List of BDSM authors
List of pornographic film directors
List of pornographic performers by decade
List of University of Florida alumni

References

Further reading

External links

 
 
 
 

Actresses from Baltimore
Actresses from Gainesville, Florida
American female adult models
American feminists
American pornographic film actresses
BDSM writers
Living people
Pornographic film actors from Florida
Pornographic film actors from Maryland
HuffPost writers and columnists
University of Florida alumni
American women columnists
American pornographic film directors
American pornographic film producers
Jewish American actresses
Jewish American artists
Jewish film people
Jewish American writers
Jewish women writers
Reform Jewish feminists
Year of birth missing (living people)
Women pornographic film directors
Women pornographic film producers
21st-century American women